Chathuranga Kumara (born 19 January 1992) is a Sri Lankan cricketer. He made his first-class debut on 27 January 2012, for Colts Cricket Club in the 2011–12 Premier Trophy. He is a past pupil of St. Joseph's College, Colombo. In July 2022, he was signed by the Colombo Stars for the third edition of the Lanka Premier League.

References

External links
 

1992 births
Living people
Sri Lankan cricketers
Chilaw Marians Cricket Club cricketers
Colts Cricket Club cricketers
Place of birth missing (living people)
Asian Games medalists in cricket
Cricketers at the 2014 Asian Games
Asian Games gold medalists for Sri Lanka
Medalists at the 2014 Asian Games
Wayamba United cricketers